Sébastien Bruno (born 26 August 1974 in Nîmes, France) is a French rugby union footballer who plays as a hooker for Toulon and formerly for France. Born in Nîmes, Bruno joined Sale Sharks from French club Béziers, making his debut against Leicester Tigers in 2004. In the 2005–2006 season, Bruno played as a replacement in the final as Sale Sharks won their first ever Premiership title. He made his international debut in 2002 against Wales, and was selected as a member of France's 2007 Rugby World Cup squad held in France. Bruno returned to France for the 2009–10 Top 14 season signing for Toulon.

Despite his sometimes inaccurate line-out throwing, Bruno is regarded as one of the strongest scrummaging hookers at international level.

In May 2013 he started as Toulon won the 2013 Heineken Cup Final by 16–15 against Clermont Auvergne.

His son was born on New Year's Eve 2007.

Bruno is now (January 2018) the assistant coach at Lyon and one of three assistant coaches with French national team.

Honours 
 Grand Slam : 2002
 Six Nations Championship : 2006
 European Challenge Cup : 2005
 Guinness Premiership : 2006
 Heineken Cup : 2013

References

External links

1974 births
French rugby union players
Sale Sharks players
RC Toulonnais players
Barbarian F.C. players
Living people
Sportspeople from Nîmes
France international rugby union players
Rugby union hookers
AS Béziers Hérault players
Section Paloise players
French rugby union coaches
French expatriate sportspeople in England
French expatriate rugby union players
Expatriate rugby union players in England